Raze the Roof is the debut studio album by New Zealand born Australian pop singer, Collette. Raze the Roof was released in October 1989 and peaked at No. 48 in Australia. The album spawned three top forty singles.

The album was made available on digital platforms online in November 2019.

Track listing

 "That's What I Like About You"	
 "Ring My Bell"
 "You Ain't Gonna Hold Me Back"	
 "Victim of the Groove"	
 "Push"	
 "All I Wanna Do Is Dance"	
 "Ordinary Man"	
 "Party Time"	
 "Only You Can Do It"	
 "Hothouse"	
 "Save Yourself"	
 "All I Wanna Do Is Dance" (Stomp Mix)

"Save Yourself" and the Stomp Mix of "All I Wanna Do is Dance" were bonus tracks on the original CD release.

Charts

References

1989 debut albums
CBS Records albums
Collette Roberts albums